The Man Who Stood in the Way is an upcoming Czech historical drama film directed by Petr Nikolaev. The film focuses on František Kriegel the only political leader who, during the Warsaw Pact invasion of Czechoslovakia, declined to sign the Moscow Protocol. It is based on a novel by Ivan Fíla of the same name. Fíla was originally set to direct the film.

Cast
Tomáš Töpfer as František Kriegel
Zuzana Mauréry as Riva Kriegelová
Adrian Jastraban as Gustáv Husák
Alois Švehlík as Ludvík Svoboda
Jiří Ployhar ml. as Oldřich Černík
Dano Heriban as Alexander Dubček
Přemysl Bureš as Josef Smrkovský
Jaroslav Mendel
Miroslav Táborský
Zuzana Kajnarová
Lukáš Kantor
Antonín Kala

Production
First preparations started in 2016 when Ivan Fíla was approached by producer Miloš Šmídmajer with idea to make a film about Kriegel. Fíla agreed and has written a book The man who stood in the way. Success of the book paved way to a film adaptation. Fíla was set to direct the film with Tomáš Töpfer set to star as Kriegel. Production was later stalled due to conflicts between Fila and Šmídmajer. In February 2020 Šmídmajer decided to replace Fíla with different director. Shooting started in November 2021 with Petr Nikolaev as the director. Shooting started in Kyiv. It was announced in August 2022 that the shooting is finished.

References

External links
 
 The man who stood in the way at CSFD.cz 

Upcoming films
Czech historical drama films
Ukrainian drama films
Lithuanian drama films
2020s Czech-language films
2020s historical drama films
Films shot in Kyiv
Warsaw Pact invasion of Czechoslovakia